Donald Roberts is a Republican member of the Montana Legislature.  He was elected to House District 56 which represents a portion of the Billings area.

References

External links 
 Donald Robert's at ballotpedia.org
 Don Robert's at ourcampaigns.com

Living people
1948 births
Republican Party members of the Montana House of Representatives